Salmon River may refer to:

Canada

British Columbia
Salmon River (Fraser River), in the Central Interior
Salmon River (Haida Gwaii), on Moresby Island
Salmon River (Langley), in the Lower Fraser Valley
Salmon River (Portland Canal), in northwestern British Columbia
Salmon River (Shuswap Lake), near Salmon Arm
Salmon River (Vancouver Island), near Kelsey Bay
The Salmo River, in the West Kootenay region, was known historically as the Salmon River
The Pa-aat River, on Pitt Island in the North Coast region, was formerly called the Salmon River

Nova Scotia
Salmon River (Nova Scotia), in Colchester County
Salmon River, Colchester County (community), a community located along this river
Salmon River, Digby County
Salmon River, Richmond County

Ontario
Salmon River (Ontario)

United States
Salmon River (Alaska) any of several rivers in Alaska
Salmon River (California)
Salmon River (Connecticut)
Salmon River (Idaho), known as the River of No Return, the largest US river with this name
Salmon River (New York), a tributary of Lake Ontario
Salmon River (Lake Champlain), south of Plattsburgh, New York
Salmon River (Clackamas County, Oregon)
Salmon River (Lincoln County, Oregon)
Salmon River (Washington)

See also
King Salmon River (disambiguation)
Rivière au Saumon (disambiguation)
Rivière aux Saumons (disambiguation)
Salmon Creek (disambiguation)
Salmon Branch, Tennessee, United States